St. Cyprian Catholic Church is located on the southwest corner of 63rd St. (Cobbs Creek Pkwy) and Hazel Ave. at 525 Cobbs Creek Parkway in Cobbs Creek, Philadelphia, Pennsylvania.

History 
The first St. Cyprian Church was established in 2000 when Saint Carthage and Transfiguration of Our Lord consolidated.

The current parish named St. Cyprian was founded in 2013 as a consolidation of six parishes in West Philadelphia:
Our Lady of the Rosary (founded 1886)
Our Lady of Victory (1899)
Transfiguration of Our Lord (1909)
Saint Carthage (1915)
Saint Cyprian (2000), and
Our Lady of the Blessed Sacrament (2005)

It is named after St. Cyprian, an African nobleman who became a bishop.

The current church was built in 1924. The campus also includes a rectory, daycare, and elementary school.

Education
The parish previously had its own school. In 2011 the Archdiocese of Philadelphia announced the closure of St. Cyprian Catholic School, as its student numbers had declined.

References

External links

St. Cyprian Official Site

Roman Catholic churches in Philadelphia
Roman Catholic churches in Pennsylvania
Christian organizations established in 2000
Roman Catholic churches completed in 1924
West Philadelphia
20th-century Roman Catholic church buildings in the United States
African-American Roman Catholic churches